The 1944  New South Wales  state election  was held on 27 May 1944. The election was for all of the 90 seats in the  Legislative Assembly.

Issues
The Labor government of William McKell faced its first challenge at a general election in May 1944. The campaign was overshadowed by the course of World War II and the Sydney Morning Herald noted that in such an uncertain environment it was difficult for any party to make extensive plans for the future. This was particularly the case as many of the responsibilities of the states had been usurped by the Commonwealth Government under emergency war powers.

McKell's three years in government had enhanced his reputation as a moderate and cautious leader. Under his leadership the extreme left wing of the party had been expelled and had contested the 1941 as the State Labor Party. Its poor showing had resulted in its dissolution shortly after the election and most members then joined the Communist Party of Australia. However, Labor unity was again threatened by Jack Lang who had been expelled from the Labor Party in 1943 and had formed another version of the Lang Labor Party. On this occasion he received no support from the rest of the caucus and spent the rest of the term as the sole member.

In comparison to the Labor Party, the urban conservative political forces were in complete disarray. The very poor results of the United Australia Party (UAP) under Billy Hughes at the 1943 federal election had increased the divisions within the party. The Democratic Party, which was a merger of the Commonwealth Party and UAP in November 1943, had emerged as the main conservative party in New South Wales state politics. It was led by Reginald Weaver and had the support of most of the former UAP members of parliament. However the Liberal Democratic Party, which had been founded by the Sydney timber merchant and businessman Ernest White (later Sir Ernest), attracted significant media attention and had a large and expensive advertising campaign. White claimed that the UAP and Democratic Party had been overly concerned with infighting and were no longer able to give coherence to conservative political aspirations. His party while supporting an extension of the welfare safety-net called for an increased effort to win the war including the mandatory deregistration of unions involved in unreasonable strike action. The Sydney Morning Herald commented that the Liberal Democratic Party was "a mouse" attempting to "swallow the Democratic Party lion".

Key dates

Results

There was little change in the composition of parliament, with Labor retaining its large majority.

At the election Lang's party won 2 of the 23 seats in which it stood candidates. Its total primary vote of 9.33%, which significantly reduced Labor's primary vote but made little difference to the distribution of seats. The Liberal Democratic Party did not fulfill pre-election predictions and gained less than 4% of the vote with no seats.
{{Australian elections/Title row
| table style = float:right;clear:right;margin-left:1em;
| title        = New South Wales state election, 27 May 1944
| house        = Legislative Assembly
| series       = New South Wales state election
| back         = 1941
| forward      = 1947
| enrolled     = 1,732,706
| total_votes  = 1,310,270		
| turnout %    = 91.42
| turnout chg  = −1.10
| informal     = 43,329	
| informal %   = 3.31
| informal chg = +0.78
}}

|}

Seats changing party representation
This table lists changes in party representation since the 1941 election but does not include United Australia Party members who retained their seats as Democratic Party members

Aftermath
McKell remained premier until he was appointed Governor General in early 1947. Weaver became the leader of the United Democratic Party, formed from the urban conservative parties in late 1944. The Democratic Party became the New South Wales division of the Liberal Party of Australia in early 1945, with Weaver becoming its inaugural leader. However, he died in November that year and was succeeded by former Premier Alexander Mair, who was then succeeded by Vernon Treatt in March 1946. Michael Bruxner retained his leadership of the Country Party, which he had held since 1932, throughout the parliament.

There were 9 by-elections during the parliament but the overall composition of the parties stayed intact.

See also
 Candidates of the 1944 New South Wales state election
 Members of the New South Wales Legislative Assembly, 1944–1947

Notes

References

Elections in New South Wales
New South Wales state election
1940s in New South Wales
New South Wales state election